Walter Shepard Felton Jr. (July 28, 1944 – April 29, 2022) is the former Chief Judge of the Court of Appeals of Virginia. He graduated from the University of Richmond in 1966 and the University of Richmond School of Law in 1969. Felton previously served as Deputy Attorney General of Virginia and law professor at the Marshall-Wythe School of Law.

Felton retired from the Court on December 31, 2014. , assuming senior status upn his retirement.

Judge Felton died on April 29, 2022.

References
 Virginia Bar Association News in Brief, April 2002, featuring a brief biographical sketch marking Felton's appointment to the Court
 University of Richmond Alumni News, Fall 2006, featuring another brief sketch marking Felton's appointment as Chief Judge
 Panel Discussion on the Role of Judges in Legal Education, Judge Felton reporting

Virginia lawyers
Living people
Judges of the Court of Appeals of Virginia
University of Richmond alumni
People from Suffolk, Virginia
1944 births